The 2002–03 Midland Football Combination season was the 66th in the history of Midland Football Combination, a football competition in England.

Premier Division

The Premier Division featured 20 clubs which competed in the division last season, along with two new clubs, promoted from Division One:
Leamington
Rugby Town

Also:
County Sports merged with Division Two club Fernhill Heath Old Boys to create Fernhill County Sports
Handsworth Continental Star reverted name to Continental Star
Kings Heath changed name to Castle Vale KH

League table

References

2002–03
9